Cetus Dwarf is a dwarf spheroidal galaxy. It lies approximately 2.46 Million light-years from Earth. It is an isolated galaxy of the Local Group, which also contains the Milky Way. All of the most readily observable stars in the galaxy are red giants.

History
The Cetus Dwarf was discovered in 1999 by Alan B. Whiting, George Hau and Mike Irwin and was found to be a member of the Local Group.

Characteristics
As of 2000, no known neutral hydrogen gas has been found that is related to the Cetus dwarf galaxy.

References

External links

Dwarf spheroidal galaxies
Local Group
Cetus (constellation)
3097691
Astronomical objects discovered in 1999